Thomas Leonard (30 May 1924 – 5 March 2004) was an Irish Fianna Fáil politician.

Tom Leonard was born in Dublin, and worked much of his life in a family business in the Dublin Corporation Wholesale Fruit and Vegetable Markets. The business had been started two generations earlier by his grandmother, continued by his father and ultimately passed to Leonard and his two brothers. While in business, Leonard was also a Dublin City Councillor.

He was elected to Dáil Éireann as a Fianna Fáil Teachta Dála (TD) for the Dublin Cabra constituency at the 1977 general election.

At the end of his first term in office, Leonard's constituency was abolished and became part of the new Dublin Central constituency. He stood there at the 1981 general election, but lost his seat; he was also an unsuccessful candidate there at the February 1982 and November 1982 general elections. Leonard did not serve again until November 1983 when he won a by-election for Dublin Central following the death of George Colley.

During this tenure, he was appointed by the party leader and former Taoiseach Charles Haughey to the New Ireland Forum.

Leonard did not contest the 1987 general election; Fianna Fáil dispensed with his candidacy from the party ticket, in favour of John Stafford and Dermot Fitzpatrick. Although it was highly unusual for a sitting TD not to be permitted to defend his seat, Leonard graciously accepted the party decision which ended his Dáil career and went back to being a city councillor. However, he had been defeated in the 1985 local elections which is a possible explanation.

He continued in the markets until his retirement, and died in Blanchardstown, Dublin in 2004.

References

 

Fianna Fáil TDs
1924 births
2004 deaths
Members of the 21st Dáil
Members of the 24th Dáil
Local councillors in Dublin (city)